The Federation of European Motorcyclists (FEM) was a motorcycling advocacy group based in Brussels, Belgium. It was formed in 1988 by representatives of various national motorcyclists' representative organisations at a meeting in Strasbourg which followed the "Eurodemo" of that year, a major demonstration by motorcyclists against what they perceived to be anti-biker European legislation.  

The FEM's first general secretary was the Briton Frank Pearson who served in the post until 1992 when he was succeeded by another Briton, Simon Milward. On the 10 January 1998, the FEM merged with the European Motorcyclists' Association to form the Federation of European Motorcyclists Associations.

See also
ABATE
American Motorcyclist Association
British Motorcyclists Federation
Helmet Law Defense League (HLDL)
Motorcycle Action Group

References 

Motorcyclists organizations
International organisations based in Belgium
Motoring Advocacy groups